Acta Ethologica is a triannual peer-reviewed scientific journal established in 1998. The journal covers all aspects of the behavioural biology of humans and other animals, including behavioural ecology, evolution of behaviour, sociobiology, ethology, behavioural physiology, and population biology.

According to SCImago Journal Rank (SJR), the journal h-index is 32, ranking it to Q2 in  Animal Science and Zoology and Q3 in Ecology, Evolution, Behavior and Systematics.

Abstracting and indexing 
The journal is abstracted and indexed in:

According to the Journal Citation Reports, the journal has a 2020 impact factor of 1.231.

References

External links 
 

Ethology journals
Springer Science+Business Media academic journals
Triannual journals
Publications established in 1999
English-language journals